Munir Masih Khokhar is a Pakistani politician who was elected member for the Provincial Assembly of Punjab.

Political career
He was elected to Provincial Assembly of Punjab on a reserved seat for minorities in 2018 Pakistani general election representing Pakistan Muslim League (N)

References

Living people
Pakistan Muslim League (N) MPAs (Punjab)
Politicians from Punjab, Pakistan
Punjab MPAs 2018–2023
Year of birth missing (living people)